University of Maiduguri Teaching Hospital is a federal government of Nigeria teaching hospital. The current chief medical officer is Ahmed Ahidjo.

History 
University of Maiduguri Teaching Hospital was inaugurated on 23 July 1983 by president Shehu Shagari. It was the first teaching hospital in the north east region.

References 

Teaching hospitals in Nigeria